Sharon Powell (born 16 July 1965) is a Jamaican former track and field athlete. She competed in the 800 metres and 4 × 400 metres relay at the 1988 Seoul Olympics, finishing fifth in the final of the relay.

International competitions

References

External links
 

1965 births
Living people
Athletes (track and field) at the 1988 Summer Olympics
Jamaican female sprinters
Jamaican female middle-distance runners
Olympic athletes of Jamaica
Place of birth missing (living people)
Olympic female sprinters
20th-century Jamaican women
21st-century Jamaican women